Perissodus microlepis is a species of cichlid endemic to Lake Tanganyika.  This species reaches a length of  TL.  This species can also be found in the aquarium trade. It is a scale-eating 'parasite' on other fish species. It occurs in two distinct morphological forms. One morph has mouth parts twisted to the left, enabling it to eat scales off its victim's right flank. In contrast, the other morph, whose mouth is twisted to the right, eats scales off its victim's left flank. The relative abundance of the two morphs in populations is regulated by frequency-dependent selection.

References

Perissodus
Articles containing video clips
Taxa named by George Albert Boulenger
Fish described in 1898
Taxonomy articles created by Polbot